

Day 1 (August 31) 
 Seeds out:
 Men's Singles:  Kei Nishikori [4],  Gaël Monfils [16]
 Women's Singles:  Ana Ivanovic [7],  Karolína Plíšková [8],  Carla Suárez Navarro [10],  Jelena Janković [21],  Sloane Stephens [29],  Svetlana Kuznetsova [30]
 Schedule of Play

Day 2 (September 1) 
 Seeds out:
 Men's Singles:  Gilles Simon [11]
 Women's Singles:  Lucie Šafářová [6],  Timea Bacsinszky [14],  Alizé Cornet [27],  Irina-Camelia Begu [28]
 Schedule of Play

Day 3 (September 2) 
 Seeds out:
 Men's Singles:  Grigor Dimitrov [17]
 Women's Singles:  Anastasia Pavlyuchenkova [31]
 Men's Doubles:  Bob Bryan /  Mike Bryan [1],  Ivan Dodig /  Marcelo Melo [2],  Vasek Pospisil /  Jack Sock [11]
 Schedule of Play

Day 4 (September 3) 
 Seeds out:
 Men's Singles:  Ivo Karlović [21],  Jack Sock [28]
 Women's Singles:  Caroline Wozniacki [4],  Garbiñe Muguruza [9]
 Men's Doubles:  Simone Bolelli /  Fabio Fognini [5],  Alexander Peya /  Bruno Soares [10],  Pablo Cuevas /  David Marrero [13],  Feliciano López /  Max Mirnyi [16]
 Women's Doubles:  Julia Görges /  Klaudia Jans-Ignacik [16]
 Mixed Doubles:  Lucie Hradecká /  Marcin Matkowski [3]
 Schedule of Play

Day 5 (September 4) 
 Seeds out:
 Men's Singles:  David Ferrer [7],  Rafael Nadal [8],  Milos Raonic [10],  David Goffin [14],  Andreas Seppi [25],  Tommy Robredo [26]
 Women's Singles:  Belinda Bencic [12],  Agnieszka Radwańska [15],  Elina Svitolina [17]
 Men's Doubles:  Juan Sebastián Cabal /  Robert Farah [14]
 Women's Doubles:  Garbiñe Muguruza /  Carla Suárez Navarro [8],  Hsieh Su-wei /  Anastasia Rodionova [10],  Anabel Medina Garrigues /  Arantxa Parra Santonja [14]
 Mixed Doubles:  Sania Mirza /  Bruno Soares [1]
 Schedule of Play

Day 6 (September 5) 
 Seeds out:
 Men's Singles:  Dominic Thiem [20],  Viktor Troicki [22],  Bernard Tomic [24],  Philipp Kohlschreiber [29],  Thomaz Bellucci [30],  Guillermo García-López [31]
 Women's Singles:  Angelique Kerber [11],  Sara Errani [16],  Andrea Petkovic [18],  Anna Karolína Schmiedlová [32]
 Schedule of Play

Day 7 (September 6) 
 Seeds out:
 Men's Singles:  Roberto Bautista Agut [23],  Jérémy Chardy [27],  Fabio Fognini [32]
 Women's Singles:  Ekaterina Makarova [13],  Madison Keys [19],  Eugenie Bouchard [25] (withdrew due to concussion)
 Men's Doubles:  Marcel Granollers /  Marc López [7]
 Women's Doubles:  Raquel Kops-Jones /  Abigail Spears [6],  Andrea Hlaváčková /  Lucie Hradecká [7],  Michaëlla Krajicek /  Barbora Strýcová [13]
 Mixed Doubles:  Raquel Kops-Jones /  Raven Klaasen [7],  Julia Görges /  Nenad Zimonjić [8]
 Schedule of Play

Day 8 (September 7) 
 Seeds out:
 Men's Singles:  Andy Murray [3],  Tomáš Berdych [6],  John Isner [13]
 Women's Singles:  Samantha Stosur [22],  Sabine Lisicki [24]
 Men's Doubles:  Daniel Nestor /  Édouard Roger-Vasselin [9],  Raven Klaasen [15] /  Rajeev Ram [15]
 Women's Doubles:  Kristina Mladenovic /  Tímea Babos [3],  Karin Knapp /  Roberta Vinci [17]
 Schedule of Play

Day 9 (September 8) 
 Seeds out:
 Men's Singles:  Feliciano López [18],  Jo-Wilfried Tsonga [19]
 Women's Singles:  Venus Williams [23]
 Men's Doubles:  Jean-Julien Rojer /  Horia Tecău [3],  Nenad Zimonjić /  Marcin Matkowski [4]
 Women's Doubles:  Chan Hao-ching /  Chan Yung-jan [9],  Andreja Klepač /  Lara Arruabarrena [15]
 Mixed Doubles:  Yaroslava Shvedova /  Juan Sebastián Cabal [6]
 Schedule of Play

Day 10 (September 9) 
 Seeds out:
 Men's Singles: Richard Gasquet [12],  Kevin Anderson [15]
 Women's Singles:  Petra Kvitová [5],  Victoria Azarenka [20]
 Men's Doubles:  Rohan Bopanna /  Florin Mergea [6]
 Women's Doubles:  Caroline Garcia /  Katarina Srebotnik [5],  Sara Errani /  Flavia Pennetta [11],  Alla Kudryavtseva /  Anastasia Pavlyuchenkova [12]
 Mixed Doubles:  Chan Yung-jan /  Rohan Bopanna [2]
 Schedule of Play

Day 11 (September 10) 
The women's semifinals match of Serena Williams vs. Roberta Vinci and Flavia Pennetta vs. Simona Halep were both scheduled on this date but cancelled due to rain, only one match was completed before the rain started.
 Schedule of Play

Day 12 (September 11) 
 Seeds out:
 Men's Singles:  Stan Wawrinka [5],  Marin Čilić [9]
 Women's Singles:  Serena Williams [1],  Simona Halep [2]
 Schedule of Play

Day 13 (September 12) 
 Seeds out:
 Men's Doubles:  Jamie Murray /  John Peers [8]
 Schedule of Play

Day 14 (September 13) 
 Seeds out:
 Men's Singles:  Roger Federer [2]
 Women's Doubles:  Casey Dellacqua /  Yaroslava Shvedova [4]
 Schedule of Play

Day-by-day summaries
US Open (tennis) by year – Day-by-day summaries